Khalid Muneer Ali Abu Bakr Mazeed (born 24 February 1998) is a Qatari professional footballer who plays as a midfielder for Qatar Stars League side Al-Wakrah and the Qatar national football team.

Career statistics

International

International goals
Scores and results list Qatar's goal tally first.

Honours

Club
Al-Duhail
Emir of Qatar Cup: 2019

References

External links
 
 

1998 births
Living people
Qatari footballers
Association football forwards
Tercera División players
Qatar Stars League players
Aspire Academy (Qatar) players
Lekhwiya SC players
Atlético Astorga FC players
Cultural Leonesa footballers
Al-Duhail SC players
Al-Wakrah SC players
Qatari expatriate footballers
Qatari expatriate sportspeople in Spain
Expatriate footballers in Spain
2022 FIFA World Cup players